Victory is a feature on Earth's Moon, a crater in Taurus–Littrow valley.  Astronauts Eugene Cernan and Harrison Schmitt visited it in 1972, on the Apollo 17 mission, during EVA 2.  The astronauts stopped at the south rim of Victory on their way back to the Lunar Module from Shorty crater.

To the west of Victory is Shorty crater and to the east are Camelot and Horatio, as well as the landing site itself.  To the south is Brontë.

The crater was named by the astronauts honoring Winston Churchill, who delivered the famous 'Victory' speech in 1940.

References

External links
43D1S2(25) Apollo 17 Traverses at Lunar and Planetary Institute
Geological Investigation of the Taurus–Littrow Valley: Apollo 17 Landing Site

Impact craters on the Moon
Apollo 17